The 1908 Washington State football team was an American football team that represented Washington State College during the 1908 college football season. Led by first-year head coach Walter Rheinschild, the team compiled a record of 4–0–2.

Schedule

References

Washington State
Washington State Cougars football seasons
College football undefeated seasons
Washington State football